Chionodes occlusa is a moth in the family Gelechiidae. It is found in North America, where it has been recorded from New York, the Northwest Territories, from Ontario to British Columbia and south to Arizona and California.

References

Chionodes
Moths described in 1916
Moths of North America